In automotive engineering, a manettino dial is a rotary switch part of some modern Ferrari cars first designed by Frank Stephenson, beginning with the Ferrari F430 in 2004. The adjustment dial is mounted on the steering wheel, usually just underneath the center of the wheel.  The dial is inspired by the controls found on F1 steering wheels, but have a more polished appearance.

The dial allows for the quick and simple adjustment of the electronics governing car suspension settings, traction control, electronic differential, and change speed of electronic gearbox.

A similar control system was employed on the Ferrari Enzo, but used individual buttons for different settings rather than a single rotary switch.

References

External links
 Article on the Ferrari F430's manettino dial
 Volante e Manettino

Auto parts
Ferrari